Brian Powell may refer to
Brian Powell (baseball) (1973–2009), American baseball player
Brian Powell (sociologist) (born 1954), American sociologist